Hard Cell is a British mockumentary sitcom streaming television series developed by Catherine Tate, who also plays six of the main characters. The series premiered on 12 April 2022 on Netflix, and consists of six episodes. The series was cancelled after one season.

Plot 
The series follows UK prison governor Laura Willis (Catherine Tate) who firmly believes that creativity leads to rehabilitation and plans to put on a musical, starring inmates and directed by ex-EastEnders star Cheryl Fergison. During the six-week rehearsals, the inmates find their voices, build self-confidence and strengthen their friendships.

Cast and characters

Main
 Catherine Tate as Laura / Ros / Ange / Big Viv / Marco / Anne Marie
 Christian Brassington as Dean
 Cheryl Fergison as Herself
 Niky Wardley as Anastasia
 Jola Olajide as Charlee
 Peter Singh as Gary

Recurring

Episodes

Production 
On 30 June 2021, it was announced that Catherine Tate would write, direct and star in a six-part Netflix comedy set in a fictional women's prison. Executive producer Kristian Smith described the series as "funny and touching all at once, revealing what life might be like in a British women's correctional facility". Donna Preston announced her involvement in the series the next day. On 30 July, Deadline shared the news that Tate's co-stars will include Christian Brassington as Dean, Niky Wardley as Anastasia, Lorna Brown as Cal, Caroline Harding as Sal, Jola Olajide as Charlee and Duncan Wisbey as Martin. Wardley and Alex Carter (who previously starred in The Catherine Tate Show Australian and New Zealand live tour) were also confirmed to be parts of the creative team behind the series.

Reception
On the review aggregator website Rotten Tomatoes, 20% of 10 critics' reviews are positive, with an average rating of 4.9/10. Metacritic, which uses a weighted average, assigned a score of 38 out of 100, based on four critics, indicating "generally unfavorable reviews".

Gabriel Tate of The Telegraph criticised the series for being dated. Rachel Aroesti of The Guardian criticised the series for a lack of plot and "an abundance of one-dimensional characters". James Hibbs of Radio Times criticised the series for immature jokes, but noted it gets better over time.
	
Nicole Vassell of The Independent noted that the series has fared better with general audiences, as the audience Rotten Tomatoes score is 88% positive. Many have especially praised the dramatic and shocking ending of the series. Speaking about the open ending and the possibility of a second series, Catherine Tate said: "I'm quite a big fan of things ending with loose ends. I think that's sort of life, isn't it? Life doesn't tie itself up in a neat bow. And so I'd be delighted if it got another series, and I'm happy for it to stand alone".

References

External links
 
 

2022 British television series debuts
2022 British television series endings
2020s British sitcoms
2020s British prison television series
British prison television series
British mockumentary television series
English-language Netflix original programming
Television shows filmed in England